Saint Melchior, or  Melichior, was purportedly one of the Biblical Magi along with Caspar and Balthazar who visited the infant Jesus after he was born. Melchior was often referred to as the oldest member of the Magi. He was traditionally called the King of Persia and brought the gift of gold to Jesus. In the Western Christian church, he is regarded as a saint (as are the other two Magi).

Tradition 

The Gospels in the New Testament do not give the names of the Magi (or even their number), but their traditional names are ascribed to a Greek manuscript from 500 AD translated into Latin and commonly accepted as the source of the names. Melchior was described by St Bede in the 8th century as being "an old man, with white hair and long beard." Melchior is also commonly referred to as the King of Persia. Following the Star of Bethlehem, the Magi first travelled to the palace of Herod the Great, who then asked for the Magi to find the Child Jesus and report back to him. Upon arriving at the house, the Magi worshipped him and opened their gifts, with Melchior giving the gift of gold to signify Jesus' kingship over the world. According to a medieval saints calendar, following his return to Persia, Melchior met up with the other Magi again in 54 AD in the Kingdom of Armenia to celebrate Christmas before dying at the age of 116 on 1 January 55 AD.

Commemoration
Melchior, along with the other Magi, is purported to be buried in the Shrine of the Three Kings in Cologne Cathedral following his remains being moved from Constantinople by Eustorgius I in 314 AD to Milan. In 1164, Holy Roman Emperor Fredrick Barbarossa moved them to Cologne. Melchior is commemorated on the Feast of Epiphany along with the other members of the Magi but is also commemorated in Catholicism with his feast day, 6 January.

References 

Biblical Magi
Christmas characters
Unnamed people of the Bible
Saints from the Holy Land
1st-century BC Christian saints
Christian saints from the New Testament